Evarcha pinguis is a species of jumping spider in the genus Evarcha that lives in Ethiopia. It was first identified by Wanda Wesołowska and Beata Tomasiewicz in 2008.

References

Endemic fauna of Ethiopia
Salticidae
Spiders of Africa
Spiders described in 2008